John Baxter may refer to:

Arts and entertainment
John Baxter (architect) (died 1798), Scottish architect
John Baxter (publisher) (1781–1858), English printer and publisher
John Baxter (director) (1896–1975), British filmmaker, 1930s–1950s
John Baxter (author) (born 1939), Australian-born writer, journalist, and filmmaker
John Baxter, pen name of intelligence officer E. Howard Hunt

Politics and law
John Baxter (MP for Stafford), Member of Parliament (MP) for Stafford. c. 1393–1396
John Baxter (Northern Ireland politician) (born 1939), Ulster Unionist politician and solicitor
John Baxter (MP) (died 1611), English lawyer and politician
John Baxter (political reformer) ( 1790–1817), English radical and political historian
John Baxter (judge) (1819–1886), North Carolina legislator and jurist
John G. Baxter (1826–1885), mayor of Louisville, Kentucky, 1870–1872
John Babington Macaulay Baxter (1868–1946), premier of New Brunswick, Canada, 1925–1931
John B. M. Baxter Jr. (1924–2000), politician in New Brunswick, Canada

Science
John Philip Baxter (1905–1989), British chemical engineer and Vice-Chancellor of the University of New South Wales, 1953–1969
John Walter Baxter (1917–2003), British civil and structural engineer, designed the Westway
John Baxter (engineer) (born 1951), British mechanical engineer
John Baxter (marine biologist), British marine biologist

Sports
John Baxter (cricketer) (1800–?), English cricketer of the 1830s
John Baxter (footballer) (1936–2014), Scottish association football player
John Baxter (rugby league) ( 1881–1927), rugby league footballer of the 1900s for Great Britain, England, and Rochdale Hornets 
John Baxter (American football) (born 1963), American football coach

Others
John Baxter (explorer) (1799–1841), friend of Edward John Eyre during crossing of Nullarbor Plain, 1840–41
J. Clifford Baxter (1958–2002), Enron Corporation executive